Cedar Avenue is a street in Minneapolis.

Cedar Avenue may also refer to:

 Cedar Avenue of Nikkō, a tree-lined section of road in Nikko, Japan
 Cedar Avenue station, a former railway facility on Staten Island, New York

See also 
 Cedar Avenue Bridge (disambiguation)